Michael E. Casey (February 1, 1870 – June 14, 1949) was an American Democratic politician and lawyer who served in the Missouri General Assembly.  He served in the Missouri Senate from 1909 until 1941 and in the Missouri House of Representatives from 1903 until 1907.

Born in Pennsylvania, he was educated in the public schools of Kansas City and graduated from Kansas City School of Law in 1899.  In 1903, he married Miss Margaret Meredith.  For many years in the 1920s and into the 1940s, Casey along with Michael Kinney and Joseph Brogan were three Democrats who dominated the Missouri Senate.

He died in Missouri at the age of eighty.

References

External links
 The Political Graveyard: A Database of American History Index to Politicians, Casebeer to Casgrain

1870 births
20th-century American politicians
Democratic Party Missouri state senators
1949 deaths